Travel + Leisure Golf was a bimonthly American magazine published by American Express. Unlike other golf magazines, Travel + Leisure Golf focused less on the sport than on the affluent golf lifestyle, with regular features on cars, resorts, wines, and spirits.

History and profile
The magazine was launched in March 1998 as a spin-off of Travel + Leisure, and was closed after the March–April 2009 issue. The final editor-in-chief was John Atwood. John Rodenburg joined as publisher in 2005. Columnists included Nick Faldo, Greg Norman and Mike Lupica.

Ian Shepherd ranked Travel + Leisure Golf as the "2nd Most Influential Golf Publication" in his 2006 and 2007 rankings.

See also
Golf Digest
Golf Magazine
Golf Week
Golf World
Kingdom
Links Magazine
golfscape

References

External links
 Travel + Leisure Golf online

Lifestyle magazines published in the United States
Bimonthly magazines published in the United States
Defunct magazines published in the United States
Magazines established in 1998
Magazines disestablished in 2009
Tourism magazines
Magazines published in New York City
Golf magazines